Saoud Al-Khalaqi (Arabic: سعود الخلاقي) (born 5 August 1993) is a Qatari footballer.

External links
 

Qatari footballers
1993 births
Living people
Al Ahli SC (Doha) players
Al-Gharafa SC players
Al-Shahania SC players
Al-Khor SC players
Qatar Stars League players
Association football forwards